Mearns's pouched mouse (Saccostomus mearnsi) is a species of rodent in the family Nesomyidae.
It is found in Ethiopia, Kenya, Somalia, Tanzania, and Uganda.
Its natural habitats are dry savanna, subtropical or tropical dry shrubland, hot deserts, and arable land.

References
 Corti, M., Oguge, N. & Coetzee, N. 2004.  Saccostomus mearnsi.   2006 IUCN Red List of Threatened Species.   Downloaded on 20 July 2007.

Saccostomus
Mammals described in 1910
Taxonomy articles created by Polbot